is a Japanese actress and singer. She made her debut as a voice actress in 1992 as the voice of Chifuru in the anime Little Twins, and became known as the voice of Hitomi Kanzaki in The Vision of Escaflowne. Other major roles in anime include Leila Malcal in Code Geass: Akito the Exiled, Jeanne d'Arc in Fate/Apocrypha, Shiki Ryōgi in The Garden of Sinners, Riho Yamazaki in Nightwalker: The Midnight Detective, Moe Katsuragi in Risky Safety, Princess Tomoyo in Tsubasa: Reservoir Chronicle, Haruhi Fujioka in Ouran High School Host Club, Sayaka Nakasugi in Birdy the Mighty, Ciel Phantomhive in Black Butler, Shinobu Oshino in Monogatari, Merlin in The Seven Deadly Sins, Motoko Kusanagi in Ghost in the Shell: Arise, Quinella in season 3 of Sword Art Online, and Echidna in Re:Zero − Starting Life in Another World.

In the Japanese localization of overseas dubs, Sakamoto has voiced Padmé Amidala in the Star Wars films and series, as well as performing the dub voice for Natalie Portman in numerous films. 

In video games, Sakamoto voices  Aigis in Persona 3, Maki Harukawa in Danganronpa V3: Killing Harmony, Aerith Gainsborough in Compilation of Final Fantasy VII, Aura and Natsume in .hack, La Mariposa in Dead or Alive, Lightning in the Final Fantasy XIII games, Ling Xiaoyu in Tekken, and Alisa Ilinichina Amiella in God Eater.

As a singer, Sakamoto has performed songs in both English and Japanese. She released her debut single "Yakusoku wa Iranai" in collaboration with Yoko Kanno under Victor Entertainment on April 24, 1996. Her singles "Tune the Rainbow", "Loop", "Ame ga Furu", and "Triangler" have all reached the top 10 Oricon singles chart: "Triangler" in particular charted at number 3 and remained charting for 26 weeks. Her albums have had similar success, with Shōnen Alice and Yūnagi Loop both reaching the top 10 Oricon albums chart; and her album You Can't Catch Me, released on January 12, 2011, became her first release to ever reach number 1. She held a concert at the Nippon Budokan on March 31, 2010, her thirtieth birthday.

Career
Born in Tokyo, Sakamoto grew up in a family formed by her parents and her older brother. She started working as a voice actress in a very early age and the first leading role she was given was in the 1993 OVA Little Twins.

In 1996, she was given the role of Hitomi Kanzaki, the leading role in the TV anime series The Vision of Escaflowne. For this anime she also performed the opening theme, which was released as her debut single on April 24, 1996. The single was produced by Yoko Kanno, who was also in charge of the soundtrack for Escaflowne. Her first album, Grapefruit, was released on April 23, 1997.  Sakamoto performed theme songs for several anime series, including Clamp School Detectives (1997), Record of Lodoss War (1998) and Cardcaptor Sakura (1999). 

Sakamoto's early music was produced by Kanno and her team, which included Yūho Iwasato, Shanti Snyder and Tim Jensen. Sakamoto worked almost exclusively with Kanno and company for almost a decade. Apart from her work as a voice actress and singer, in October 1996 Sakamoto also debuted as a radio host presenting her own program, Sakamoto Maaya no Naisho-banashi, on radio station Nack 5.

In 2003, Sakamoto made her debut as a theatre actress on the Japanese version of the musical Les Misérables, playing the role of Éponine. This year she also starred in her first TV drama Suekko Chounan Ane San-nin, and also played the leading role in the short film 03† directed by Hidenori Sugimori. On the other hand, Sakamoto's 11th single "Tune the Rainbow" (released on April 2, 2003), became her first Top 10 single in Japan, peaking at number 9 in the Oricon weekly charts. Her fourth album, Shōnen Alice, released on December 10, 2003, became her first Top 10 album on the Oricon charts and also her last record to be produced exclusively by Yoko Kanno; since this release Sakamoto would involve further in the music making process and production of her records. Her fifth album, Yūnagi Loop, released on October 26, 2005, was her first co-produced by herself along with musician Mistuyoshi Tamura, whom she would continue working in her subsequent records. This album's lead single, "Loop"—ending theme for TV anime series Tsubasa Chronicle—peaked at number seven on the Oricon charts, also becoming her highest chart peaking single at that time.

In 2008, Sakamoto worked once again with Yoko Kanno for her 15th single, "Triangler", which was used as opening theme for the TV anime series Macross Frontier. "Triangler" became a big hit, peaking at the Top 3 single of the Oricon charts. The single ended up becoming Sakamoto's biggest selling single to date, with more than 90,000 copies sold. The song was later included in Sakamoto's sixth album, Kazeyomi, which was released in January 2009 and also peaked within the Top 3. For promoting this album, Sakamoto began her first low-scale national tour, on which she held three concerts in Nagoya, Osaka and Tokyo. The tour was later released as her first live DVD on August 11, 2011.

In 2010, Sakamoto celebrated her 15th anniversary in the entertainment industry, releasing on March 31—her 30th birthday—her greatest hits album Everywhere, and also holding a concert at the Nippon Budokan. also in 2010, Sakamoto was playing the role of Ritsuko Nonomura in Japanese musical adaption of the South Korean movie A Moment to Remember, along with Rina Chinen and Rina Uchiyama (best known for starring in Strawberry on the Shortcake, Good Luck!!, Fire Boys, Memories of Matsuko). In 2011, her seventh album, You Can't Catch Me, became her first album to reach the first stop of the Oricon charts.

Her 2012 Mitsubachi tour concluded with an announcement at her New Year's Eve concert of a new full-length album of songs written and composed solely by Sakamoto, as well as a short concert tour to support it. The album, titled Singer Song Writer, featured two new versions of Sakamoto's previous compositions "Everywhere" and "Chikai", as well as eight original tracks.

On September 25, 2017, The NHK Anime World website revealed that Sakamoto will perform "Clear" (Sakamoto 27th single, Released on January 31, 2018), the opening song for the Anime Adaptation of Cardcaptor Sakura: Clear Card. Sakamoto and Yoshiki Mizuno from Ikimonogakari co-written the song's lyrics, while music arrangement was arranged by Shin Kōno.

Collaborations
Sakamoto first teamed up with composer Yoko Kanno in her 1996 debut single, "Yakusoku wa Iranai" ("Promises Not Needed"), which was used as the opening theme for the anime series The Vision of Escaflowne. Kanno collaborated with Sakamoto up until her fifth album, Yūnagi Loop, which has no songs composed by Kanno. Sakamoto also performed three songs for the series Wolf's Rain, for which Kanno was the composer: "Gravity" (which is sung completely in English), "Tell Me What The Rain Knows" (with lyrics by Chris Mosdell) and "Cloud 9". She performed "Hemisphere", the opening theme of the series RahXephon, as well as two songs for the series' theatrical version RahXephon: Pluralitas Concentio: "Tune the Rainbow" and "The Garden of Everything" (duet with Steve Conte). In 2008, Sakamoto and Kanno collaborated again for "Triangler", the opening theme song for the series Macross Frontier. She also performed the song "cream" with HIDE, which was featured in the Ghost in the Shell: Stand Alone Complex mini album be Human. She was one half of the voice acting duo Whoops!!, alongside Chieko Higuchi.

Personal life
Sakamoto graduated from Toyo University with a Bachelor's degree in Sociology in 2002. On August 8, 2011, she married fellow voice actor and frequent co-star Kenichi Suzumura. On December 27, 2021, she announced that she was expecting her first child with Suzumura. On April 21, 2022, the couple announced the birth of their first child.

Filmography

Animation

Film

Drama CD

Video games

Commercials

Musicals
Angel Touch - Rin Otō
Bangare - Nin Sasaki
Daddy Long Legs ~Ashinaga Oji-san Yori~ - Jerusha Abbott
Les Misérables (Japanese production) - Éponine Thénardier
Letter ~ Bring to Light - Ritsuko Nonomura
Mizuiro Jidai - Natsumi Kugayama

Radio
 - Bay-FM
 - TBS Radio
Broadcast date: April 7, 2007 ~ March 28, 2009
Konica Minolta presents Night on the Planet - Tokyo FM
Yellow tail music tail - Tokyo FM
Sapporo Beer Key of Dish - Tokyo FM
 - Nack5
Girls' School Fantasy – NACK5
 - Nack5, FM Osaka, FM Aichi
 – FM Fukuoka, Sendai City-FM, FM-Nigata, K-Mix
 - Nack5, FM Osaka, North Wave, Cross FM
  - Nippon Cultural Broadcasting
 - Nippon Cultural Broadcasting

Webcast
Maaya Sakamoto's Full Moon Recital Hall (September 23, October 23, November 22, December 21, 2010) -Ustream
reading of Japanese literary works
one of the special projects offered by a Japanese online magazine "Saizensen"

Other dubbing

Live-action

Animation
{| class="wikitable sortable plainrowheaders"
! Title
! Role
! class="unsortable"| Notes
! class="unsortable"| Source
|-
| Barbie and the Magic of Pegasus || rowspan="2"|Barbie || ||
|-
| Barbie: Fairytopia || ||
|-
| The Boss Baby: Family Business || Carol Templeton ||  || 
|-
| Brandy & Mr. Whiskers || Brandy Harrington ||  ||
|-
| Legends of Oz: Dorothy's Return || Dorothy Gale || ||
|-
| The Lego Movie 2: The Second Part || General Sweet Mayhem || ||
|-
| Sing || rowspan=2|Rosita ||  ||
|-
| Sing 2 || ||
|-
| Spider-Man: Into the Spider-Verse || Lyla || ||
|-
| Star Wars: Clone Wars || rowspan="3"| Padmé Amidala || ||
|-
| Star Wars: The Clone Wars (film) || ||
|-
| Star Wars: The Clone Wars (TV) || ||
|-
| Tinker Bell || rowspan="6"| Fawn || ||
|-
| Tinker Bell and the Lost Treasure || ||
|-
| Tinker Bell and the Great Fairy Rescue || ||
|-
| Tinker Bell and the Secret of the Wings || ||
|-
| Tinker Bell and the Pirate Fairy || ||
|-
| Tinker Bell and the Legend of the NeverBeast || ||
|-
| What If...? || Jane Foster || ||
|-
|}

Discography

Studio albums
1997: Grapefruit1998: Dive2001: Lucy2003: Shōnen Alice2005: Yūnagi Loop2009: Kazeyomi2011: You Can't Catch Me2013: Singer-songwriter2015: Follow Me Up2019: Kyo Dake no OngakuCompilation albums
1999: Single Collection+ Hotchpotch2003: Single Collection+ Nikopachi2010: Everywhere2012: Single Collection+ Mitsubachi2020: Single Collection+ Achikochi Awards and nominations 
In the 23rd Anime Grand Prix, she ranked tenth place under the voice actress category with 126 votes.

In addition, in the first Seiyu Awards, she was nominated for "Best Actress in a leading role" for her portrayal of Haruhi Fujioka in Ouran High School Host Club as well as "Best Musical Performance" for Tsubasa Chronicle's ending theme Loop.

Publications
Serialization
Sakamoto Maaya no Manpukuron  – Currently in Newtype.
- A monthly column

Books
 – December 9, 2005 – Essay collection
 – April 18, 2008 – Photo and lyrics book compilationfrom everywhere.'' – February 21, 2011 – Essay collection

Notes

References

External links
 
  
  
  
  
 
 
 

1980 births
Living people
Anime singers
English-language singers from Japan
Japanese child actresses
Japanese YouTubers
Japanese-language singers
Japanese musical theatre actresses
Japanese video game actresses
Japanese voice actresses
Japanese women pop singers
Music YouTubers
Singers from Tokyo
Toyo University alumni
Victor Entertainment artists
Voice actresses from Tokyo
20th-century Japanese actresses
21st-century Japanese actresses
20th-century Japanese women singers
20th-century Japanese singers
21st-century Japanese women singers
21st-century Japanese singers